Rhagonycha fulva, the common red soldier beetle, also misleadingly known as the bloodsucker beetle, and popularly known in England as the hogweed bonking beetle is a species of soldier beetle (Cantharidae).

Taxonomy
Rhagonycha fulva was first described by Giovanni Antonio Scopoli in 1763 in Entomologia Carniolica as Cantharis fulva.

Description
Rhagonycha fulva measures  in length. Its antennae are black, occasionally the first segment is orange. The head and pronotum are orange and shiny, with fine pubescence visible on the head. The shape of the pronotum is variable, but it narrows towards the head. The elytra cover the wings and most of the abdomen and are a dark, shiny red in colour, and terminate in a clearly visible black patch on the apical end - this is one of their key identifying features. Its femora and tibiae are orange, but the tarsi are black; the third segment of the tarsi is simple rather than bilobed.

Distribution
This beetle is very common in Europe and Anatolia. Introduced to North America, it is well established in British Columbia and Quebec and recently recorded in Ontario.

Life cycle
Adults feed on aphids, and also eat pollen and nectar. Larvae prey on ground-dwelling invertebrates, such as slugs and snails, and live at the base of long grasses. The adults, which are active between the months of June and August, spend much of their short lives mating and can often be seen in pairs.

Behaviour
Rhagonycha fulva is commonly found on open-structured flowers and can be spotted in grassland, woodland, along hedgerows and in parks and gardens, often on flower species such as Anthriscus sylvestris (Cow Parsley) and others of the genus Heracleum (Hogweed) and the family Asteraceae during the summer. R. fulva is a significant pollinator of two species of Hogweed, Heracleum sphondylium, and H. mantegazzianum.

Gallery

References

External links
Common red soldier beetle at English Nature
Common red soldier beetle at UKNature
Narrated Video about the common red soldier beetle

Cantharidae
Beetles described in 1763
Beetles of Asia
Beetles of Europe
Beetles of North America
Articles containing video clips
Taxa named by Giovanni Antonio Scopoli